Matanuska Glacier is a valley glacier in the US state of Alaska. Its terminus feeds the Matanuska River. Due to ablation of the lower glacier, the location of the glacier terminus has changed little over the previous three decades.

Nearby state park: An Alaska State Parks facility, the Matanuska Glacier State Recreation Site, is a  park with trails and a small campground.
 
Vehicle and walking access: As the largest glacier in Alaska accessible by car, travelers have options for up-close viewing or walking on the ice. Matanuska Glacier is accessible by a single road, S Glacier Park Road found at mile 102 of the Glenn Highway. This gravel road with small bridge crossing comes to an electronic gate operated by Glacier Tours on the Matanuska. Glacier Tours also maintains the remainder of the drive to the glacier, as well as parking, a shelter, paths, and picnic tables. Visitors may pay a fee for  tours with a local guide; these are operated year-round. Additional tours depart from downtown Anchorage and include a guide with shuttle service to Matanuska Glacier.

Fun fact: The glacier is the eponym of the Alaska Marine Highway ferry MV Matanuska.

Gallery

See also
 Matanuska Formation
 Glacier National Park
 List of glaciers

References

Glaciers of Alaska
Glaciers of Matanuska-Susitna Borough, Alaska
Tourist attractions in Matanuska-Susitna Borough, Alaska